This is a list of the number-one hits of 1964 on Italian Hit Parade Singles Chart.

See also
1964 in music
List of number-one hits in Italy

References

1964 in Italian music
1964 record charts
1964